Billed as "a motor-car symphony", the American Simplex was an American automobile manufactured in Mishawaka, Indiana, United States, from 1906 to 1915 by the Simplex Motor Car Company; the company shortened its product's name to Amplex in 1910 to avoid confusion with the better-known, New York-based Simplex car, made by the Simplex Automobile Company. This change also coincided with a reorganization of the company. Originally the company manufactured a two-stroke four-cylinder 50hp model, later upsized to 6.8 liters and still rated at 50 hp.  In 1910, three open-roof models and two enclosed models were offered, costing up to $5,400; the newly introduced 30/50 hp Toy Tonneau, a long, sleek four-door touring car, sold for $4,300. The Amplex's most distinctive feature was its valveless motor, which the company claimed would offer more continuous pulling power and greater reliability.  The 1910 models also offered self-starting, a feature that would not be available from major competitors, such as Cadillac, for another year or two.

They were expensive cars - large, luxurious and handsomely designed, a limousine being offered at as much as $5,600. Yet the firm kept using the two-stroke engine after it had become obsolete; a four-stroke was offered unsuccessfully in 1913. Gillette Motor Co took over the Amplex manufacturing facilities in 1916, but refused to manufacture conventional engine-valving, persisting with a rotary sleeve valve engine.

See also
 List of automobile manufacturers

References

Brass Era vehicles
Vehicles introduced in 1906
Motor vehicle manufacturers based in Indiana
Defunct motor vehicle manufacturers of the United States
Defunct companies based in Indiana
Vehicle manufacturing companies established in 1906
Vehicle manufacturing companies disestablished in 1916
1900s cars
1910s cars
1916 disestablishments in Indiana
1906 establishments in Indiana